First Homme is the second Korean EP released by K-POP group ZE:A. The album was released on June 2, 2014.

Background
On May 23, 2014 Star Empire Entertainment announced that ZE:A would have a comeback, after a ten-month hiatus, with their second EP. Following the announcement various teaser pictures were released.

Track list

References

External links
English Wikipedia
Music Daum Page

ZE:A albums
2014 EPs